Feliciani is an Italian surname. Notable people with the surname include:

 Anthony Feliciani (1804–1866), Italian priest and the second Prefect Apostolic of Hong Kong
 Mario Feliciani (1918–2008), Italian actor and voice actor
 Porfirio Feliciani (died 1634), Italian Roman Catholic prelate who served as Bishop of Foligno 

Italian-language surnames